Andrew Blair Hastie (born 5 November 1970 in Christchurch) is a retired field hockey player from New Zealand, who was a regular member of the men's national team, nicknamed The Black Sticks, during the 1990s. Hastie earned a total number of 68 caps during his career. He coached the Canterbury Cavaliers to the 2005 New Zealand NHL title. Andrew has 3 children.

References
NZ commonwealth games
NZ caps

1970 births
Living people
New Zealand male field hockey players
New Zealand field hockey coaches
Field hockey players at the 1998 Commonwealth Games
1998 Men's Hockey World Cup players
Field hockey players from Christchurch
Commonwealth Games competitors for New Zealand
20th-century New Zealand people
21st-century New Zealand people